Angela Lavinia Bray, Baroness Bray of Coln (born 13 October 1953) is a British Conservative Party politician who was the Member of the London Assembly for West Central from 2000 to 2008, and Member of Parliament (MP) for Ealing Central and Acton from 2010 to 2015.

Early life and career
Bray was born in Croydon to Benedict Eustace Charles Tevery Bray and Patricia Measures who were residents of the Isle of Man. She was educated at Downe House School, Thatcham, and later attended the University of St Andrews, where she studied medieval history.

In 1979 she joined the British Forces Broadcasting Service in Gibraltar; a year later she joined LBC Radio as a presenter, producer and reporter.

Political career
She was employed as head of broadcasting at Conservative Central Office from 1989. She was a press officer for John Major's 1990 leadership campaign. During the 1992 general election campaign she served as press secretary to Chris Patten, the Chairman of the Conservative Party. She assisted the party's press office again in the 2005 election campaign, after which she worked as a public affairs consultant.

Bray unsuccessfully contested East Ham at the 1997 general election, finishing second behind Stephen Timms. She was a member of the London Assembly for West Central London from 2000 until she stood down in 2008, acting as Conservative leader in the Assembly from 2006. She was placed on the 'A-List' of Conservative Party candidates for the 2010 general election. She won in the constituency of Ealing Central and Acton.

After Bray's election to Parliament, she was appointed Parliamentary Private Secretary to the Cabinet Office Minister, Francis Maude.

She was sacked as Parliamentary Private Secretary in July 2012, after she voted against a coalition government Bill on reforming the House of Lords.

She lost her seat in the 2015 general election.

It was announced on 14 October 2022, that as part of Boris Johnson's 2022 Political Honours, Bray would be appointed a life peer. On 8 November 2022, she was created Baroness Bray of Coln, of Coln St. Aldwyns in the County of Gloucestershire.

References

External links
 Angie Bray's website

 Profile at Conservative Party
 Biography from the London Assembly
 Ealing Acton & Shepherds Bush Conservatives

1953 births
Living people
Conservative Party (UK) MPs for English constituencies
UK MPs 2010–2015
Female members of the Parliament of the United Kingdom for English constituencies
Conservative Members of the London Assembly
Alumni of the University of St Andrews
British radio journalists
British women journalists
21st-century British women politicians
British women radio presenters
21st-century English women
21st-century English people
Women councillors in England
Conservative Party (UK) life peers
Life peeresses created by Charles III
UK MPs who were granted peerages